The Alleycats is a Malaysian band which was formed in 1969, and gained popularity in the late 1970s. It consists of musicians from Penang who were popular in their home state earlier on in their career.

History
There were earlier line-ups of this band but the original line-up mentioned were the ones that took the Alleycats to great height of achievements musically. The Alleycats was always on top of the musical scene in Malaysia even before it was signed up as a recording band.

This line-up secured a performance contract in the Mocambo Club situated in Central, a business sector on Hong Kong island in 1976. It was supposed to be a three-month contract but the band's success in wooing the crowd earned it three yearly contracts bundled with TV and concert appearances as means of promoting the band. It became a hit with the locals in Hong Kong. It was not until it left Hong Kong to start a new performance contract in Singapore that the band was spotted by major recording companies.

The Alleycats started out in 1978 by signing a contract with Polygram Records-Philips to produce an album. It went to Hong Kong to record its album in Dragon Studio. Later, Lion Studio in Singapore was responsible for mastering the Alleycats' albums. Its first released album was Terima Kasih (Thank You), with their first single Senandung Semalam (Yesterday's Serenade).

The existence of this band was vital to the Malaysian music industry. With more than twenty recordings, it had contributed to the development of the Malaysian music industry and is still regarded as one of the legendary Malaysian pop music bands of all time in the country. Despite the  changes, the band is still active in performing and recording. The Alleycats have a strong fan base from all walks of life in Malaysia, Indonesia, and Singapore.

Band members

Current members
David Arumugam - vocals (1969 - present)
Glenville Charles Salay - vocals
Priyadashini Loganathan (also known as Dasha Loga) - vocals
David John - drums
Nazaruddin Abdullah - lead guitar
Loh Kum Swee (also known as Jimmy Loh) - bass guitar  
Prawing Aroonratana (also known as Mike Prawing) - keyboards

Former members
Loganathan Arumugam - vocals (1969 - 2007); died 2007
Tan Chin Hock - drums
Shunmugam Arumugam - lead guitar
Chester Anthony Passerella - saxophone
Khoo Fook Sin and Grenville Pereira (Gren) - keyboards
Frank Ong - bass guitar
Ramesh - lead guitar 

Their music is said to be influenced by Air Supply, Phil Collins, Bee Gees, Billy Joel, David Gates & Bread, Santana and Paul McCartney.

Most of the Alleycats albums were produced by Eric Yeo. Most of its hit songs were penned by music supremo M. Nasir with the lyrics composed by S.Amin Shahab. The M. Nasir/S.Amin combination were most noticeable on hit songs such as Hingga Akhir Nanti (Till The End), Andai Aku Pergi Dulu (If I Go Before You), Sekuntum Mawar Merah Sebuah Puisi (A Red Rose And A Poem), Setahun Sudah Berlalu (A Year Has Passed), Seribu Bintang (A Thousand Stars), Nota Terakhir (This Last Note).

On 27 December 2019, former bass player Frank Ong died of lung cancer aged 54.

Death of Loganathan
Loganathan Arumugam, a vocalist of the Alleycats, died on 4 June 2007 following an 8-month battle with lung cancer. His death was deeply mourned by Alleycats fans as reported in the press and media.

An Alleycats Music Video Competition, held as a tribute to the late Loganathan Arumugam of Alleycats was conducted between 25 June 2006 – 25 July 2007. This was jointly organised by NGT Solutions (M) Sdn Bhd and Universal Music Malaysia, with the support from Multimedia Development Corporation (MDeC). It was in line with the government's initiative in encouraging contentpreneurs to develop local content and to be able to identify creativity in the minds of Malaysians.

A year after the loss of Loga to lung cancer, the Alleycats was the lead artiste in a concert organised by the Lung Foundation of Malaysia (LFM) to raise money for its activities.  Established in November 2005, LFM is a non-profit Foundation geared towards offering support for patients afflicted with lung diseases to enable them to lead a better quality lifestyle with minimal suffering.

Discography

References

External links
 Puisi Cinta Romantis

People from Penang
Musical groups established in 1969
Malaysian pop rock music groups
Malaysian people of Indian descent
Sibling musical groups
Universal Music Group artists
Malaysian funk musical groups
Malaysian disco groups